Pascal Pelletier (born June 16, 1983) is a Canadian professional ice hockey forward who is currently an unrestricted free agent. He most recently played for the ZSC Lions of the National League (NL). He is one of four players from Labrador to play in the NHL. Pelletier was born in Labrador City, Newfoundland and Labrador.

Playing career
As a youth, Pelletier played in the 1996 and 1997 Quebec International Pee-Wee Hockey Tournaments with a minor ice hockey team from Quebec City.

Undrafted, Pelletier played in the Quebec Major Junior Hockey League before making his professional debut in the ECHL with the Louisiana IceGators. In the 2005–06 season, Pelletier was signed to an AHL contract with the Providence Bruins and after a solid season was signed to a NHL contract with parent club, the Boston Bruins, on August 7, 2006.

Pelletier made his NHL debut with the Boston Bruins during the 2007–08 season, he was first recalled from Providence on January 16, 2008. Pelletier played in a total of six games. On July 24, 2008, Pelletier was traded by the Bruins to the Chicago Blackhawks for Martin St. Pierre. He signed a one-year contract with the Blackhawks on August 8, 2008.

After a year playing for the Blackhawks' AHL affiliate the Rockford IceHogs, Pelletier signed a one-year deal with Columbus Blue Jackets of the NHL for the 2009–10 season. On December 8, 2009 he was traded to the St. Louis Blues for Brendan Bell and Tomas Kana. He was immediately sent to their affiliate the Peoria Rivermen.

On May 19, 2010, Pelletier left for Europe signing a one-year contract with Swiss team, the SCL Tigers of the National League A.

On July 5, 2013, Pelletier returned to North America after three seasons with the SCL Tigers, signing a one-year two-way contract with the Vancouver Canucks. He was assigned to begin the 2013–14 season with AHL affiliate, the Utica Comets. He was recalled to the Canucks on October 20, and played his first NHL game since 2009.

On June 24, 2014, receiving limited opportunity in his single season with the Canucks, Pelletier opted to return to Europe in signing a one-year contract with Croatian club, Medveščak Zagreb  the KHL.

After a single season with the Canucks AHL affiliate, the Utica Comets in 2016–17, Pelletier returned to Switzerland in agreeing to a contract with the GCK Lions of the Swiss League on August 14, 2017.

Career statistics

Awards and honours

References

External links

1983 births
Living people
Admiral Vladivostok players
Baie-Comeau Drakkar players
Boston Bruins players
Canadian expatriate ice hockey players in Croatia
Canadian expatriate ice hockey players in Finland
Canadian expatriate ice hockey players in Russia
Canadian expatriate ice hockey players in Switzerland
Canadian ice hockey left wingers
Chicago Blackhawks players
Franco-Newfoundlander people
GCK Lions players
Gwinnett Gladiators players
Ice hockey people from Newfoundland and Labrador
Jokerit players
KHL Medveščak Zagreb players
Louisiana IceGators (ECHL) players
People from Labrador City
Peoria Rivermen (AHL) players
Providence Bruins players
Rockford IceHogs (AHL) players
SCL Tigers players
Shawinigan Cataractes players
Undrafted National Hockey League players
Utica Comets players
Vancouver Canucks players
ZSC Lions players